The 1996 America's Red Clay Court Championships was a men's tennis tournament played on outdoor clay courts at the Sportsplex in Coral Springs, Florida in the United States and was part of the World Series of the 1996 ATP Tour. It was the fourth edition of the tournament and took place from May 13 through May 19, 1996. Jason Stoltenberg won the singles title.

Finals

Singles

 Jason Stoltenberg defeated  Chris Woodruff 7–6(7–4), 2–6, 7–5
 It was Stoltenberg's only singles title of the year and the 3rd of his career.

Doubles

 Todd Woodbridge /  Mark Woodforde defeated  Ivan Baron /  Brett Hansen-Dent 6–3, 6–3
 It was Woodbridge's 6th title of the year and the 46th of his career. It was Woodforde's 7th title of the year and the 50th of his career.

References

External links
 Official website
 ATP tournament profile

America's Red Clay Court Championships
Delray Beach Open
Coral Springs, Florida
America's Red Clay
America's Red Clay Court Championships
America's Red Clay Court Championships